For the Summer Olympics, there are 13 venues that have been or will be used in badminton.

References

Venues
!
Badm